Callopistria phaeogona is a moth of the family Noctuidae. It is found in Taiwan.

References

Moths described in 1908
Caradrinini
Moths of Taiwan